Wen Li Lai (born 28 May 2000 in Sabah), also known as Lai Wen Li, is a Malaysian professional squash player. As of February 2018, she was ranked number 131 in the world. She has competed in the main draw of multiple professional PSA tournaments. She won the 2019 NZ International Squash Classic.

References

2000 births
Living people
Malaysian female squash players
Southeast Asian Games medalists in squash
Southeast Asian Games gold medalists for Malaysia
Competitors at the 2019 Southeast Asian Games